L'Atlàntida is an 1877 poem in Catalan by Jacint Verdaguer. It consists of an introduction, ten books, and a conclusion, dealing with the wanderings of Heracles in the Iberian Peninsula, the sinking of the continent of Atlantis, the creation of the Mediterranean Sea, and the discovery of the Americas.

This poem was written by Verdaguer in honour of shipping magnate Antonio López y López, first Marquis of Comillas.

Manuel de Falla's opera Atlántida is based on this poem.

References

External links

Jacint Verdaguer
1877 poems
Epic poems in Catalan